Heterocnephes lymphatalis is a moth in the family Crambidae. It was described by Charles Swinhoe in 1889. It is found in China, Thailand, Cambodia, Peninsular Malaysia, north-eastern India and Myanmar, as well as on the Mollucas, Borneo, Sulawesi and Java.

References

Moths described in 1889
Moths of Borneo
Spilomelinae